"What's Wrong with That Girl" is a song by Australian singer songwriter Rick Price. It was released as the third single from his debut studio album  Heaven Knows in September 1992. The song peaked at No. 45 in Australia.

Track listing
CD single (471285)
 "What's Wrong With That Girl" – 4:10	
 "We've Got Each Other"
 "Not a Day Goes By" (live acoustic version) –	3:32

Charts

References

Rick Price songs
Songs written by Rick Price
1992 songs
1992 singles
Columbia Records singles